Waitakaruru is a rural community in the Hauraki District and Waikato region of New Zealand's North Island. It is situated at the mouth of Waitakaruru River

Demographics
The SA1 area is part of the larger Hauraki Plains North statistical area.

The SA1 area had a population of 243 at the 2018 New Zealand census, an increase of 21 people (9.5%) since the 2013 census, and an increase of 6 people (2.5%) since the 2006 census. There were 105 households, comprising 132 males and 111 females, giving a sex ratio of 1.19 males per female. The median age was 41.8 years (compared with 37.4 years nationally), with 48 people (19.8%) aged under 15 years, 42 (17.3%) aged 15 to 29, 114 (46.9%) aged 30 to 64, and 39 (16.0%) aged 65 or older.

Ethnicities were 85.2% European/Pākehā, 28.4% Māori, 4.9% Pacific peoples, and 4.9% Asian. People may identify with more than one ethnicity.

Although some people chose not to answer the census's question about religious affiliation, 56.8% had no religion, 23.5% were Christian, 3.7% had Māori religious beliefs, 1.2% were Buddhist and 4.9% had other religions.

Of those at least 15 years old, 21 (10.8%) people had a bachelor's or higher degree, and 66 (33.8%) people had no formal qualifications. The median income was $27,100, compared with $31,800 nationally. 21 people (10.8%) earned over $70,000 compared to 17.2% nationally. The employment status of those at least 15 was that 90 (46.2%) people were employed full-time, 24 (12.3%) were part-time, and 6 (3.1%) were unemployed.

Hauraki Plains North

Hauraki Plains North had a population of 1,155 at the 2018 New Zealand census, an increase of 57 people (5.2%) since the 2013 census, and an increase of 66 people (6.1%) since the 2006 census. There were 447 households, comprising 603 males and 552 females, giving a sex ratio of 1.09 males per female. The median age was 40.7 years (compared with 37.4 years nationally), with 234 people (20.3%) aged under 15 years, 213 (18.4%) aged 15 to 29, 519 (44.9%) aged 30 to 64, and 189 (16.4%) aged 65 or older.

Ethnicities were 89.4% European/Pākehā, 17.1% Māori, 3.6% Pacific peoples, 2.9% Asian, and 2.1% other ethnicities. People may identify with more than one ethnicity.

The percentage of people born overseas was 10.6, compared with 27.1% nationally.

Although some people chose not to answer the census's question about religious affiliation, 56.6% had no religion, 29.6% were Christian, 1.0% had Māori religious beliefs, 0.5% were Buddhist and 2.1% had other religions.

Of those at least 15 years old, 93 (10.1%) people had a bachelor's or higher degree, and 231 (25.1%) people had no formal qualifications. The median income was $33,600, compared with $31,800 nationally. 138 people (15.0%) earned over $70,000 compared to 17.2% nationally. The employment status of those at least 15 was that 462 (50.2%) people were employed full-time, 168 (18.2%) were part-time, and 24 (2.6%) were unemployed.

Education

References

Hauraki District
Populated places in Waikato
Populated places around the Firth of Thames